Sari Qomish (also Romanized as Sārī Qomīsh) is a village in Akhtachi-ye Mahali Rural District, Simmineh District, Bukan County, West Azerbaijan Province, Iran. At the 2006 census, its population was 943, in 184 families.

References 

Populated places in Bukan County